1880 was the 94th season of cricket in England since the foundation of Marylebone Cricket Club (MCC). The second tour by a representative Australian team was undertaken and they took part in the (retrospective) first Test match to be played in England. County cricket was dominated by the Nottinghamshire bowlers Alfred Shaw and Fred Morley.

Champion County

 Nottinghamshire

Playing record (by county)

Leading batsmen (qualification 20 innings)

Leading bowlers (qualification 1,000 balls)

Notable events

 The first Test match in England was played at The Oval from 6 to 8 September and England won by five wickets.
 Alfred Shaw achieved the lowest-ever average by any bowler taking over 100 first-class wickets. No bowler has had a single-figure average for over 100 wickets since.

Notes
An unofficial seasonal title sometimes proclaimed by consensus of media and historians prior to December 1889 when the official County Championship was constituted. Although there are ante-dated claims prior to 1873, when residence qualifications were introduced, it is only since that ruling that any quasi-official status can be ascribed.

References

Annual reviews
 John Lillywhite’s Cricketer's Companion (Green Lilly), Lillywhite, 1881
 James Lillywhite’s Cricketers' Annual (Red Lilly), Lillywhite, 1881
 John Wisden's Cricketers' Almanack 1881

External links
 CricketArchive – season summaries

1880 in English cricket
English cricket seasons in the 19th century